Canadian singer and songwriter Carly Rae Jepsen has received 29 awards from 71 nominations, including an American Music Award, four Billboard Music Awards, three Juno Awards, three Much Music Video Awards and two Teen Choice Awards.

In 2007, Jepsen placed third in Canadian Idol season five's competition. Before signing with Interscope, in 2008 she independently released her debut album, Tug of War, which its eponymous lead single won the award for Song of the Year at the 2010 Canadian Radio Music Awards. Her second album, title Kiss (2012), won two awards at the 2013 Juno Awards, winning the Album of the Year. The first single, "Call Me Maybe", was nominated for two Grammy Awards and won several other accolades, including the Billboard Music Award, MuchMusic Video Award and MTV Europe Music Award. Jepsen's collaboration with Owl City, "Good Time", won two Billboard Japan Music Awards.

American Music Awards
The American Music Awards (AMAs) is an annual American music awards show, created by Dick Clark in 1973.

Billboard Awards

Billboard Music Awards
The Billboard Music Awards was discontinued in 2007, but returned in 2011.

Billboard Japan Music Awards
Founded by Billboard Japan, the Billboard Japan Music Awards honor artists, both Japanese and foreign, who had achieved best results in Billboard Japan charts.

Billboard's Women in Music Awards
Billboard's Women in Music Awards is a ceremony held annually by Billboard to honor influential female artists and music executives.

Canada's Walk of Fame
Canada's Walk of Fame, located in Toronto, Ontario, Canada, is a walk of fame that acknowledges the achievements and accomplishments of successful Canadians. First awarded in 2010, the Allan Slaight Award is awarded to young Canadians for making a positive impact in the fields of music, film, literature, visual or performing arts, sports, innovation or philanthropy." Recipients receive an honorarium of $10,000 from the Slaight Foundation, but are not considered inductees of the Walk of Fame.

Canadian Radio Music Awards
The Canadian Radio Music Awards is an annual series of awards presented by the Canadian Association of Broadcasters that are part of Canadian Music Week.

Grammy Awards
The Grammy Awards is an accolade by the National Academy of Recording Arts and Sciences (NARAS) of the United States to recognize outstanding achievement in the music industry. It shares recognition of the music industry as that of the other performance arts: Emmy Awards (television), the Tony Awards (stage performance), and the Academy Awards (motion pictures).

Juno Awards
The Juno Awards is presented annually to Canadian musical artists and bands to acknowledge their artistic and technical achievements in all aspects of music. New members of the Canadian Music Hall of Fame are also inducted as part of the awards ceremonies.

Los Premios 40 Principales
Los Premios 40 Principales is an award presented by the musical radio station Los 40 Principales. It was created in 2006 as part of the celebrations for their fortieth anniversary.

Los Premios 40 Principales América
The American edition of Los Premios 40 Principales, established in 2012.

MuchMusic Video Awards
The Much Music Video Awards (MMVAs), originally named the Canadian Music Video Awards before 1995 is an annual awards presented by the Canadian TV channel Much to honour the year's best music videos.

MTV Awards

MTV Video Music Awards
An MTV Video Music Awards (commonly abbreviated as VMA) is an award presented by the cable channel MTV to honor the best music videos of the year. Originally conceived as an alternative to the Grammy Awards (in the video category), the annual MTV Video Music Awards ceremony has often been called the "Super Bowl for youth". The statue given to winners is an astronaut on the moon, one of the earliest representations of MTV, and colloquially called a "moonman". Jepsen was nominated twice.

MTV Movie & TV Awards
An MTV Movie & TV Awards  is an award presented by the cable channel MTV to honor the best on cinema and television of the year.

MTV Europe Music Awards
The MTV Europe Music Awards (EMA) is presented by MTV Networks Europe which awards prizes to musicians and performers. Originally conceived as an alternative to the MTV Video Music Awards and since 2011 other worldwide, regional nominations have been added.

MTV Video Music Awards Japan
The MTV Video Music Awards Japan is the Japanese version of the MTV Video Music Awards.

MP3 Music Awards
{| width="80%" class="wikitable"
|-
! style="width:10%;"| Year
! style="width:40%;"| Category
! style="width:35%;"| Nominated work
! style="width:15%;"| Result
!
|-
|align="center"|2012
| "Call Me Maybe"
| The IRP Award
| 
|

Nickelodeon Kids' Choice Awards
The Nickelodeon Kids' Choice Awards, is an annual awards show that airs on the Nickelodeon cable channel, which honors the year's biggest television, movie, and music acts, as voted by Nickelodeon viewers.

NRJ Music Award
The NRJ Music Awards is an award presented by the French radio station NRJ to honor the best in the French and worldwide music industry.

People's Choice Awards
The People's Choice Awards is an American awards show, recognizing the people and the work of popular culture, voted on by the general public.

Polaris Music Prize
The Polaris Music Prize is a Canadian awards show, recognizing artistic merit, regardless of genre, sales, or record label, voted on by the journalists and music critics.

Rober Awards Music Poll
{| width="80%" class="wikitable"
|-
! style="width:10%;"| Year
! style="width:40%;"| Category
! style="width:35%;"| Nominated work / recipient
! style="width:15%;"| Result
!
|-
| rowspan=2|2015
| Best Pop
| rowspan=3|Carly Rae Jepsen 
| 
| rowspan=2|
|-
| rowspan=2|Guilty Pleasure
| 
|-
| 2016
|  
|

SOCAN Awards
The SOCAN (the Society of Composers, Authors and Music Publishers of Canada) is the Canadian copyright collective for the right to communicate to the public and publicly perform musical works. SOCAN administers these rights on behalf of its members (composers, lyricists, songwriters, and their publishers) and those of affiliated international organizations by licensing the use of their music in Canada.

SiriusXM Indies Awards
The SiriusXM Indies Awards are awarded to recognize Canadian and international artists in independent music sector.

Teen Choice Awards
The Teen Choice Awards is an annual awards show that airs on Fox television network. The awards honor the year's biggest achievements in music, movies, sports, television, fashion, and more, voted by teen viewers (ages 13 to 19). Winners receive a full size surfboard designed with the graphics of that year's show.

The Daily Californian Art Awards

!Ref.
|-
| 2018
| "Party for One"
| Best Non-Billboard Song
| 
|

Western Canadian Music Awards
The Western Canadian Music Awards (WCMAs) are an annual awards event for music in the western portion of Canada.  The awards are provided by the Western Canada Music Alliance, the award presentation gala takes place on the final evening of the Breakout West music conference & festival, which takes place in a different Western Canadian city each year.

World Music Awards
The World Music Awards is an annual international awards show founded in 1989 that honours recording artists based on worldwide sales figures provided by the International Federation of the Phonographic Industry (IFPI).

References

Jepsen, Carly Rae
Awards